Junqueira may refer to:

People:
Bruno Junqueira (born 1976), Brazilian race car driver
Diego Junqueira (born 1980), professional Argentinian tennis player
João Junqueira (born 1965), retired Portuguese runner
Junqueira Freire (1832–1855), Brazilian poet and Benedictine monk
Durval Junqueira Machado, Brazilian footballer
Paulo Alfeu Junqueira Duarte (1899–1984), Brazilian archaeologist and humanist

Other:
ARCD Junqueira, amateur futsal team based in Santa Cruz do Bispo, Portugal
Junqueira (Póvoa de Varzim), shopping street in downtown Póvoa de Varzim in Portugal
Junqueira cow, cattle breed from Brazil